Hathua Assembly constituency is an assembly constituency in Gopalganj district in the Indian state of Bihar. In 2020 Rajesh Kumar Singh Kushwaha of Rashtriya Janata Dal defeated Ramsewak Singh Kushwaha of Janata Dal (United) to emerge victorious. 
Hathua Assembly constituency is part of No. 17 Gopalganj (Lok Sabha constituency) (SC).

History
As per "Delimitation of Parliamentary and Assembly constituencies Order, 2008, No. 104", Hathua Assembly constituency is composed of the following: Hathua and Gopalganj

Phulwaria community development blocks; Jamsar, Trilokpur, Mohaicha, Balesara gram panchayats and Mirganj (NA) of Uchkagaon CD Block.

Members of Legislative Assembly

Election results

2020

References

External links
 

Assembly constituencies of Bihar
Politics of Gopalganj district, India